Namer is an Israeli infantry fighting vehicle.

Namer may also refer to:

 Larry Namer, American television executive
 IAI Nammer, a canceled Israeli fighter aircraft project
 Namer, the Hebrew word for leopard